Jean Cinqarbres (Latin name Quinquarboreus) (c.1520s in Aurillac – June 1565) was a French grammarian of Hebrew. With his colleague Jean Mercier (Hebraist) (Mercerus) he shared the role of conjunct royal professor of Hebrew and Syriac.

Publications 
1546: De Re grammatica Hebraeorum opus 
1549: Targum, seu Paraphrasis Caldaica in Lamentationes Jeremiae prophetae 
1551: Sanctum Domini Nostri Jesu Christi hebraicum Evangelium secundum Matthaeum
1559: Institutiones in linguam hebraïcam, sive Epitome operis de re grammatica Hebraeorum
1559: Tabula in grammaticen hebraeam, authore Nicolao Clenardo, a Johanne Quinquarboreo repurgata et annotationibus illustrata
1570: Avicennae. Libri tertii fen secunda, quae latine ex synonymo hebraïco Ophan reddi potest : intuitus, sive rotundus sermo secundus, qui est de aegritudinibus nervorum, tractatu uno contentus, ad fidem codicis hebraïci latinus factus

References 

Academic staff of the Collège de France
French Hebraists
French translators
Medieval Hebraists
1520s births
1565 deaths
People from Aurillac